Shannon Leigh Taylor (born November 17, 1967) is an American attorney, and the incumbent Commonwealth's Attorney for Henrico County, Virginia. A graduate of the University of Virginia and the University of Richmond School of Law. In 2011, she announced her campaign for the 2011 Henrico County Commonwealth's Attorney election, winning against Bill Janis and Matthew Geary, and subsequently being reelected in 2015 and 2019.

Biography

Early Life and Career 
A native of Charlottesville Virginia, Taylor attended the University of Virginia and received a bachelor's degree majoring in international relations in 1989. After graduating, Taylor moved to Richmond, Virginia and worked at Hunton & Williams as a paralegal before attending University of Richmond School of Law and receiving her Juris Doctor in 1995.[1]

Shannon began her legal career as a prosecutor in the City of Richmond Commonwealth's Attorney Office and later served as Special Assistant in the United States Attorney's Office in 1999 and again from 2002-2004.

After leaving the U.S. Attorney's Office, Shannon served as Special Counsel for the Richmond Multi-Jurisdictional Grand Jury from 2004-2008.

Henrico County Commonwealth's Attorney 
On August 11, 2011, Taylor announced her candidacy for the 2011 Henrico County Commonwealth's Attorney election[2]with only 11 weeks to go before the election. The office was an open contest as the incumbent, Wade A. Kizer, announced that he would be suspending his candidacy for his fifth term.[3] Her opponent was attorney Matthew Geary, who was a law school classmate and had been campaigning since 2009, and later Bill Janis, who announced his campaign days later.[4][5]

Taylor won an upset victory over both, receiving 25,975 votes while Janis received 21,540 votes and Geary received 9,045 votes. Some, including Taylor, attributed the win to the split Republican votes between Geary and Janis.[6][7] Taylor is the first woman to hold the position in Henrico County.

Taylor planned to make the office more diverse and to create cooperation between the office and police.[8] In 2015, Taylor announced that she would be running for a second term, remaining unopposed in the Democratic primary. She faced prosecutor Tony Pham, who won the Republican primary against Jeffrey Lee Everhart and Shannon Dillon. Pham took aim at Taylor's leadership but ultimately lost in the general election.[9][10]

Taylor ran for a third term in 2019, facing against Owen Inge Conway, a lawyer she fired when she initially took office.[11][12] Taylor won against Conway by a landslide with 56% of the vote.[13]

Taylor currently serves as President of the Virginia Association of Commonwealth's Attorneys.

Prosecution of Ku Klux Klan Leader 
On June 7, 2020, a man his truck into a crowd of peaceful protesters.[14] The perpetrator was an admitted leader of the Ku Klux Klan. Taylor announced charges of assault, battery, attempted malicious wounding, and felony vandalism.[15][16] He was found guilty and sentenced to six year in prison.[17]

Consideration of Campaign for Attorney General 
In 2020, there was speculation of whether Taylor would run for the 2021 Virginia Attorney General election. In December 2020, Taylor released a statement that she would not run for attorney general.[18][19] In January 2021, she announced that she would endorse Mark Herring, the incumbent attorney general.[20][21]

Public Attention

Appointment of Special Prosecutor 
In 2013, Taylor released a statement that she had requested the judge to appoint a special prosecutor to the case involving Joe Morrissey and his sexual relationship with a minor. Taylor thought that in order for the public to have complete confidence and trust in the proceedings, it was appropriate for decisions to be made by someone outside of Henrico County and that had no prior relationships with the individuals potentially involved. 

In 2016, Morrissey exposed himself to a legal client. Taylor began an investigation[22] and later said that although Morrissey was "wrong and unethical", he would not be charged.[23][24][25]

Police Integrity 
In June 2020, Taylor announced that her office would add a new deputy for police integrity to review police use of force accusations, investigate and review body-worn camera footage, and help determine whether charges are appropriate.[26][27] She created it in response to the murder of George Floyd the previous month, and began looking for a deputy to fill the office.[28][29] She appointed attorney Misty Whitehead, a Black Lives Matter supporter, to fill the position, but had funding pulled by County Manager John Vithoulkas after he said that Taylor did not talk to him about the office.[30][31][32]

Tony Pham 
In October 2020, protesters gathered at former rival Tony Pham's house to protest Pham's campaign against immigrants as he had become the Acting Director of U.S. Immigration and Customs Enforcement in August. Many protesters were arrested for trespassing and littering, with many other participants refuting the accusations. Many called Taylor to release the arrested protesters.[33][34]

Political positions

Death penalty 
Taylor has called for the end of the death penalty in Virginia, citing that there is "absolutely no data, no research out there that suggests that the death penalty [...] deters people from crime".

Electoral history

References 

University of Virginia alumni
University of Richmond School of Law alumni
People from Henrico County, Virginia
Virginia Democrats
County and city Commonwealth's Attorneys in Virginia
1967 births
Living people